{{DISPLAYTITLE:Iota2 Fornacis}}

Iota2 Fornacis is the Bayer designation for a star in the southern constellation of Fornax. It is faintly visible to the naked eye on a dark night, having an apparent visual magnitude of 5.83. The distance to this star, based upon an annual parallax shift of 29.46 mas, is around 111 light-years. It is a member of the thin disk population of the Milky Way galaxy.

The suffix notation indicates that absorption lines of iron and the carbon–hydrogen G-band are abnormally weak. It has an estimated 1.42 times the mass of the Sun and 1.4 times the Sun's radius. The star is around 3.67 billion years old, and is spinning with a leisurely projected rotational velocity of 4.7 km/s.

Iota2 Fornacis has a common proper motion companion, a magnitude 13.74 star at a position angle of 81.80 arcseconds along a position angle of 6°. This object has about 35% of the Sun's mass.

References

F-type main-sequence stars
Fornax (constellation)
Fornacis, Zeta
CD-30 973
016538
12288
777